Laurent Banadi  is an Upper Volta football defender who played for Upper Volta in the 1978 African Cup of Nations. He played for Rail Club du Kadiogo.

External links

11v11 Profile

Year of birth missing (living people)
Living people
Association football defenders
Burkinabé footballers
Burkina Faso international footballers
1978 African Cup of Nations players
Rail Club du Kadiogo players
21st-century Burkinabé people